Mukhi is a surname. Notable people with the surname include:
Anjali Mukhi, Indian television actress
Gourav Mukhi, Indian professional footballer
Jagdish Mukhi (born 1942), Indian politician
Meet Mukhi, Indian film and television child actor

Hindustani-language surnames
Surnames of Hindustani origin